The 1954–55 Hapoel Kfar Saba season was the club's 28th season since its establishment in 1928, and 7th since the establishment of the State of Israel.

During the season, the club competed in Liga Alef (top division) and the State Cup.

Review and events
 On 14 August 1954, the club played the first match of the new season, a friendly match against Hapoel Jerusalem, drawing 3–3.
 The club played one international friendly match during the season, against AC Omonia, on 28 May 1955, losing 1–4.

Match Results

Legend

Liga Alef
 
League matches began on 6 February 1955, and by the time the season, only 20 rounds of matches were completed, delaying the end of the league season to the next season.

League table (as of 2 July 1955)

Source:

Matches

Results by match

State Cup

References
The 40s-50s-60 Hapoel Kfar Saba Official Site 

Hapoel Kfar Saba F.C. seasons
Hapoel Kfar Saba